Eurema irena is a butterfly in the family Pieridae. It is endemic to Sulawesi.

Taxonomy
Eurema irena was treated as a subspecies of Eurema simulatrix, but formally raised to full species status by Yata in 1994.

References

irena
Butterflies described in 1932